Johannes Kekana (born 25 April 1972) is a South African long-distance runner who specialized in the marathon.

He won the marathon event at the 2003 All-Africa Games. In addition to several marathon wins on home soil, he finished seventeenth at the 2009 World Championships and second at the 2010 Stockholm Marathon.

His personal best times were 1:02:14 hours in the half marathon, achieved in July 2009 in Port Elizabeth; 1:19:19 hours in the 25 kilometres, achieved in May 2010 in Pretoria; and 2:14:37 hours in the marathon, achieved in September 2002 in Sion's Town.

References

1972 births
Living people
South African male marathon runners
Athletes (track and field) at the 2003 All-Africa Games
African Games gold medalists for South Africa
World Athletics Championships athletes for South Africa
African Games medalists in athletics (track and field)